Topiroxostat (INN; trade names Topiloric, Uriadec) is a drug for the treatment of gout and hyperuricemia.  It was approved for use in Japan in June 2013.

Topiroxostat is a xanthine oxidase inhibitor which reduces serum urate levels.

References 

Xanthine oxidase inhibitors
Triazoles
Pyridines
Nitriles